Apomasu (Yam) Festival is an annual harvest festival celebrated by the chiefs and peoples of Ntotoroso-Asutifi in the Ahafo Region formally, Brong Ahafo region of Ghana. It is usually celebrated in the month of January.

Celebrations 
During the festival, visitors are welcomed to share food and drinks. The people put on traditional clothes and there is durbar of chiefs. There is also dancing and drumming.

Significance 
This festival is commemorated for more than 900years and it is used to pay homage to the Apomasu shrine and it is claimed it has people coming far and near to seek favor.

References 

Festivals in Ghana
Ahafo Region